Las Animas County is a county located in the U.S. state of Colorado. As of the 2020 census, the population was 14,555. The county seat is Trinidad. The county takes its name from the Mexican Spanish name of the Purgatoire River, originally called El Río de las Ánimas Perdidas en el Purgatorio, which means "River of the Lost Souls in Purgatory."

Geography
It is the largest county by area in Colorado.

Adjacent counties

Otero County - north
Pueblo County - north
Bent County - northeast
Baca County - east
Union County, New Mexico - south
Colfax County, New Mexico - southwest
Costilla County- west
Huerfano County - northwest

Major highways
  Interstate 25

  U.S. Highway 160
  U.S. Highway 350
  State Highway 12
  State Highway 109
  State Highway 389

Protected areas
Comanche National Grassland
Lake Dorothey State Wildlife Area
James M. John State Wildlife Area
San Isabel National Forest
Spanish Peaks Wilderness
Fishers Peak State Park
Trinidad Lake State Park

Historic trails and landmarks
Mesa de Maya
Raton Pass National Historic Landmark
Santa Fe National Historic Trail
Trinidad State History Museum

Scenic byways
Highway of Legends Scenic Byway
Santa Fe Trail National Scenic Byway

Demographics

At the 2000 census there were 15,207 people, 6,173 households, and 4,092 families living in the county.  The population density was 3 people per square mile (1/km2).  There were 7,629 housing units at an average density of 2 per square mile (1/km2).  The racial makeup of the county was 82.63% White, 0.39% Black or African American, 2.54% Native American, 0.37% Asian, 0.20% Pacific Islander, 10.03% from other races, and 3.83% from two or more races.  41.45% of the population were Hispanic or Latino of any race.
Of the 6,173 households 28.80% had children under the age of 18 living with them, 49.90% were married couples living together, 11.60% had a female householder with no husband present, and 33.70% were non-families. 29.70% of households were one person and 14.30% were one person aged 65 or older.  The average household size was 2.40 and the average family size was 2.97.

The age distribution was 24.20% under the age of 18, 7.90% from 18 to 24, 24.00% from 25 to 44, 25.90% from 45 to 64, and 18.00% 65 or older.  The median age was 41 years. For every 100 females there were 95.80 males.  For every 100 females age 18 and over, there were 93.70 males.

The median household income was $28,273 and the median family income  was $34,072. Males had a median income of $27,182 versus $20,891 for females. The per capita income for the county was $16,829.  About 14.00% of families and 17.30% of the population were below the poverty line, including 20.00% of those under age 18 and 17.20% of those age 65 or over.

Politics
A Democratic stronghold since the days of Franklin Roosevelt after having been solidly Republican during the "system of 1896" like the rest of Hispanic Colorado, Las Animas County has seen a strong trend toward the Republican Party in recent elections. Hillary Clinton's 2016 performance was the worst by a Democrat since John W. Davis in 1924. She was also the first Democrat to lose the county since George McGovern in 1972. In 2020, Joe Biden became the first Democrat to win the presidency without the county since Woodrow Wilson in 1912.

Communities

City
Trinidad

Towns
Aguilar
Branson
Cokedale
Kim
Starkville

Unincorporated communities

Boncarbo
Earl
Model
Thatcher
Trinchera
Tyrone
Villegreen

Former towns

Brodhead
Delagua
Delhi
Ludlow
Madrid
Morley
Sopris
Tercio

Census-designated places

El Moro
Hoehne
Jansen
Lynn
Segundo
Stonewall Gap
Valdez
Weston

See also
Outline of Colorado
Index of Colorado-related articles
Colorado census statistical areas
National Register of Historic Places listings in Las Animas County, Colorado

References

External links

Colorado County Evolution by Don Stanwyck
Colorado Historical Society

 

 
Colorado counties
1866 establishments in Colorado Territory
Eastern Plains
Populated places established in 1866